The third season of the Russian reality talent show The Voice Kids premiered on February 20, 2016 on Channel One. Dmitry Nagiev returned as the show's presenter. Dima Bilan and Pelageya returned as coaches. Leonid Agutin replaced Maxim Fadeev as coach. Danil Pluzhnikov was announced the winner on April 29, 2016 marking Dima Bilan's first win as a coach.

Coaches and presenters

There was a change to the coaching panel from season two. Coaches Dima Bilan and Pelageya are joined by Leonid Agutin (The Voice coach), who replaced Maxim Fadeev.

Also there was a change to the presenters panel from season two. Presenter Dmitry Nagiev is joined by Valeria Lanskaya, who replaced Anastasia Chevazhevskaya.

Teams
Colour key

Blind auditions
Colour key

Episode 1 (February 20)
The winners of the previous seasons and the coaches performed "Have You Ever Seen the Rain?" at the start of the show.

Episode 2 (February 26)

Episode 3 (March 4)

Episode 4 (March 11)

Episode 5 (March 18)

Episode 6 (March 25)

The Battles
The Battles round started with the first half of episode 7 and ended with the first half of episode 9 (broadcast on April 1, 8, 15, 2016).
Contestants who win their battle will advance to the Sing-off rounds.
Colour key

The Sing-offs
The Sing-offs round started with the second half of episode 7 and ended with the second half of episode 9 (broadcast on April 1, 8, 15, 2016). 
Contestants who was saved by their coaches will advance to the Final.
Colour key

Live shows
Colour key

Week 1: Live Playoffs (April 22)
As with Season 2, each coach saved three artists who were eliminated in the Sing-offs.
Playoff results were voted on in real time. Nine artists sang live and six of them were eliminated by the end of the night.
Three saved artists advanced to the Final.

Week 2: Final (April 29)

Reception

Ratings

References

3
2016 Russian television seasons